"The Moment" is an instrumental by American Smooth jazz saxophonist Kenny G, from his seventh studio album The Moment which was released in 1996.

Music video
The music video of the song starts with Kenny G coming in a Seaplane and playing his Soprano saxophone. Then, the scene breaks to him flying in the plane to downtown Seattle, where Kenny G hails from. Then performing again in variety of locations, song production house, a sunset scene, in front of Pike Place Market, a crowd  watching him performing and finally in the waterfront of Seattle.

Chart performance
"The Moment" was Kenny G's first hit in Billboard Hot 100 in three years. The song reached number 63. It also reached the Hot R&B Singles and Adult Contemporary charts at numbers 62 and 16, respectively.

Track listings
CD-Maxi BMG

Charts

See also
 Smooth jazz

References

External links
 Kenny G's official Website

1996 singles
1990s instrumentals
Kenny G songs
1996 songs
Arista Records singles